Mickey Gall (born January 22, 1992) is an American professional mixed martial artist who competed in the welterweight division of the Ultimate Fighting Championship.

Early life
Gall was born in Green Brook, New Jersey. He began training in boxing at the age of 13, and transitioned to Brazilian jiu-jitsu at 16. Gall was also a wrestler and football captain at Watchung Hills Regional High School. In order to pay for his jiu-jitsu training as a full-time Rutgers student, Gall worked as a bread truck driver for Walmart.

Gall is an accomplished grappler, having won multiple NAGA and Grapplers Quest titles.

Mixed martial arts career
After going 3–0 as an amateur, Gall made his professional debut for the Dead Serious MMA promotion in November 2015. He faced fellow debutant Ron Templeton and won via submission in the first round. Gall's bout was featured on Dana White's Lookin' for a Fight reality show, which earned him a UFC contract.

Ultimate Fighting Championship
Gall made his promotional debut on February 6, 2016, at UFC Fight Night 82, where he faced fellow newcomer Mike Jackson. After rapidly knocking Jackson down, Gall won the fight by submission just 45 seconds into the first round and earned a bout against CM Punk.

Gall was initially expected to face CM Punk on June 4, 2016, at UFC 199, but the pairing was delayed after Punk suffered a herniated disc. The fight eventually took place on September 10, 2016, at UFC 203. Gall took down Punk early in the fight and submitted him with a rear-naked choke in the first round.

Gall next faced Sage Northcutt on December 17, 2016, at UFC on Fox 22. In the second round Gall was knocked down and subsequently scored a knockdown himself, eventually winning the fight via submission.

Gall faced Randy Brown on November 4, 2017, at UFC 217. He lost the fight via unanimous decision.

Gall faced George Sullivan on August 25, 2018, at UFC Fight Night 135. He won the fight via submission in the first round, marking Gall's fifth rear-naked choke victory in five career wins.

Gall faced Diego Sanchez on March 2, 2019, at UFC 235. He lost the fight via TKO in the second round.

Gall faced Salim Touahri on August 3, 2019, at UFC on ESPN 5. He won the fight via unanimous decision.

Gall was scheduled to face Carlos Condit on December 7, 2019, at UFC on ESPN 7. However, Condit was forced to pull from the event due to a detached retina, thus the bout was subsequently cancelled.

Gall was scheduled to face Alex Oliveira on February 29, 2020, at UFC Fight Night 169. However, on December 27, 2019, the bout was pulled from the event by the UFC. The bout was not replaced and no reason for the cancellation was given by the promotion.

Gall next faced Mike Perry on June 27, 2020, at UFC on ESPN: Poirier vs. Hooker. After getting knocked down in the second round, he ultimately lost the fight via unanimous decision.

Gall was scheduled to face Miguel Baeza on September 19, 2020, at UFC Fight Night 178. However, on September 10, 2020, Gall pulled from the event due to injury.

Gall faced Jordan Williams on July 24, 2021, at UFC on ESPN: Sandhagen vs. Dillashaw. He won the fight via rear-naked choke submission in round one.

Gall faced Alex Morono on December 4, 2021 at UFC on ESPN 31. After getting knocked down in the first round, he lost the fight via unanimous decision.

As the last fight of his prevailing contract, Gall faced Mike Malott on April 9, 2022, at UFC 273. He lost the fight via knockout in round one.

In September 2022, it was reported that Gall had fought out his contract and was no longer part of the UFC roster.

Mixed martial arts record

|Loss
|align=center|7–5
|Mike Malott
|TKO (punches)
|UFC 273
|
|align=center|1
|align=center|3:41
|Jacksonville, Florida, United States
|
|-
|Loss
|align=center|7–4
|Alex Morono
|Decision (unanimous)
|UFC on ESPN: Font vs. Aldo 
|
|align=center|3
|align=center|5:00
|Las Vegas, Nevada, United States
|
|-
|Win
|align=center|7–3
|Jordan Williams
|Submission (rear-naked choke)
|UFC on ESPN: Sandhagen vs. Dillashaw 
|
|align=center|1
|align=center|2:57
|Las Vegas, Nevada, United States
|
|-
|Loss
|align=center|6–3
|Mike Perry
|Decision (unanimous)
|UFC on ESPN: Poirier vs. Hooker
|
|align=center|3
|align=center|5:00
|Las Vegas, Nevada, United States
|
|-
|Win
|align=center| 6–2
|Salim Touahri
|Decision (unanimous) 
|UFC on ESPN: Covington vs. Lawler
|
|align=center|3
|align=center|5:00
|Newark, New Jersey, United States
|
|-
|Loss
|align=center|5–2
|Diego Sanchez
|TKO (punches)
|UFC 235 
|
|align=center|2
|align=center|4:13
|Las Vegas, Nevada, United States
|
|-
|Win
|align=center|5–1
|George Sullivan
|Submission (rear-naked choke)
|UFC Fight Night: Gaethje vs. Vick
|
|align=center|1
|align=center|1:09
|Lincoln, Nebraska, United States
|
|-
|Loss
|align=center|4–1
|Randy Brown
|Decision (unanimous)
|UFC 217
|
|align=center|3
|align=center|5:00
|New York City, New York, United States
|
|-
| Win
| align=center| 4–0
| Sage Northcutt
| Submission (rear-naked choke)
| UFC on Fox: VanZant vs. Waterson
| 
| align=center| 2
| align=center| 1:40
| Sacramento, California, United States
|
|-
| Win
| align=center| 3–0
| CM Punk
| Submission (rear-naked choke)
| UFC 203
| 
| align=center| 1
| align=center| 2:14
| Cleveland, Ohio, United States
|
|-
| Win
| align=center| 2–0
| Mike Jackson
| Submission (rear-naked choke)
| UFC Fight Night: Hendricks vs. Thompson
| 
| align=center| 1
| align=center| 0:45
| Las Vegas, Nevada, United States
|
|-
| Win
| align=center| 1–0
| Ron Templeton
| Submission (rear-naked choke)
| Dead Serious MMA 17
| 
| align=center| 1
| align=center| 2:53
| Philadelphia, Pennsylvania, United States
|
|-

See also
 List of male mixed martial artists

References

External links
 
 

1992 births
Living people
American male mixed martial artists
Mixed martial artists from New Jersey
Mixed martial artists utilizing boxing
Mixed martial artists utilizing Muay Thai
Mixed martial artists utilizing wrestling
Mixed martial artists utilizing Brazilian jiu-jitsu
Watchung Hills Regional High School alumni
Welterweight mixed martial artists
American Muay Thai practitioners
People from Green Brook Township, New Jersey
American practitioners of Brazilian jiu-jitsu
People awarded a black belt in Brazilian jiu-jitsu
Rutgers University alumni
Ultimate Fighting Championship male fighters